Biddeford High School (BHS) is a public high school in Biddeford, Maine, United States. It is the secondary school for Biddeford Public Schools, a school district which exclusively serves the city of Biddeford.

History 

The first public high school in Biddeford was established in 1848. The building for the high school was erected on Washington Street close to the city's downtown. After a rise in Biddeford's population in the late 19th-century, a new high school was constructed in 1888 on a lot in close-by Alfred Street.  The former high school building on Washington Street was then converted to a primary school before being demolished in the 1960s.

The high school moved to its new building in 1890. The Alfred Street building suffered a massive fire in 1893 and was promptly rebuilt. A rear annex and gymnasium were added in 1925.

The high school moved out of the Alfred Street building in the 1960s to its present location farther away from the Downtown core. This coincided with the establishment of the Biddeford Regional Center of Technology in 1969 located at the same location.

Sports 
Biddeford High School football has won 12 football state championships since 1950. The school has a long-standing football rivalry with Saco's Thornton Academy dating to 1893 which is referred to as the "Battle of the Bridges" by residents of both communities. This is in reference to the multiple bridges which interconnect the two cities over the Saco River. After Biddeford High School was demoted to Class B in 2015, the two teams no longer compete with one another in state championships.

Notable alumni
Fred Davis Jr. - politician
Brian Dumoulin - professional ice hockey player
Ryan Fecteau - politician and the Speaker of the Maine House of Representatives
Dennis Gadbois - former football wide receiver

Notable staff 

 Alan Casavant - politician and teacher

References

Public high schools in Maine
Schools in York County, Maine
Education in Biddeford, Maine